Banco Central de Timor-Leste (BCTL,) is the central bank of East Timor located in its capital Dili.

BCTL was formally established on 13 September 2011, replacing the Banking and Payments Authority of Timor-Leste (BPA) and the Central Payments Office. It is responsible for the monetary policy.

The main functions:

conducting policies to maintain domestic price stability
fostering the liquidity and solvency of a stable market-based banking and financial system
providing the foreign exchange policy
promoting a safe, sound, and efficient payment system
supporting the general economic policies of the government.

Governors

References 

Article contains translated text from Banco Central de Timor-Leste on the Portuguese Wikipedia retrieved on 14 March 2017.

External links 
Homepage

Central banks
Banks of East Timor
Banks established in 2011